Spencer R. Weart (born 1942) is the former director of the Center for History of Physics of the American Institute of Physics (AIP) from 1971 until his retirement in 2009.

Life 
Originally trained as a physicist, he is now a historian of science. He earned his B.A. in Physics at Cornell University in 1963 and a Ph.D. in Physics and Astrophysics at the University of Colorado, Boulder, in 1968. He then did postdoctoral studies at the Hale Observatories and California Institute of Technology, publishing papers on solar physics; from 1971 to 1974 he studied history of science in the University of California, Berkeley. While directing the AIP Center for History of Physics he taught courses at Johns Hopkins University and Princeton University.

Interviews 
He conducted oral history interviews of many physical scientists, particularly astrophysicists such as Subrahmanyan Chandrasekhar (1977) and climate scientists such as Wallace Broecker (1997).

Works 
He has produced numerous historical articles and two children's science books and written or co-edited eleven other books, including the following: 
Scientists in Power (1979). A history of the rise of nuclear science, weapons, and reactors in France. 
as editor with Gertrud Weiss Szilard: Leo Szilard: His Version of the Facts (1978). Edited correspondence. 
Nuclear Fear: A History of Images (1989) 
as editor with Lillian Hoddeson, Ernest Braun & Jürgen Teichmann: Out of the Crystal Maze: Chapters from the History of Solid State Physics (1992). 
Never at War: Why Democracies Will Not Fight One Another (1998). 
The Discovery of Global Warming (2003, 2008). Online extended version. 
 The Rise of Nuclear Fear (2012). 

While at AIP he also produced and edited an award-winning website with historical exhibits.

References

External links 
AIP list of Spencer Weart's publications
History that Matters: Spencer Weart 
Abraham Pais Prize for History of Physics citation
History of Physics website with exhibits edited by Spencer Weart
Bright Idea: The First Lasers (laser history; text by Spencer Weart)

21st-century American historians
21st-century American male writers
21st-century American physicists
1942 births
Living people
Nuclear weapons policy
Nuclear history of the United States
American historians of science
Cornell University alumni
University of Colorado Boulder alumni
American male non-fiction writers